In chemistry and geology, biomarkers are any suite of complex organic compounds composed of carbon, hydrogen and other elements or heteroatoms such as oxygen, nitrogen and sulfur, which are found in crude oils, bitumen, petroleum source rock and eventually show simplification in molecular structure from the parent organic molecules found in all living organisms.  Essentially, they are complex carbon-based molecules derived from formerly living organisms. Each biomarker is quite distinctive when compared to its counterparts, as the time required for organic matter to convert to crude oil is characteristic. Most biomarkers also usually have high molecular mass. 

Some examples of biomarkers found in petroleum are pristane, triterpanes, steranes, phytane and porphyrin. Such petroleum biomarkers are produced via chemical synthesis using biochemical compounds as their main constituents. For instance, triterpanes are derived from biochemical compounds found on land angiosperm plants. The abundance of petroleum biomarkers in small amounts in its reservoir or source rock make it necessary to use sensitive and differential approaches to analyze the presence of those compounds. The techniques typically used includes gas chromatography and mass spectrometry.

Uses

Petroleum biomarkers are highly important in petroleum inspection as they help indicate the depositional territories and determine the geological properties of oils. For instance; they provide more details concerning their maturity and the source material. In addition to that they can also be good parameters of age, hence they are technically referred to as "chemical fossils". The ratio of pristane to phytane (pr:ph) is the geochemical factor that allows petroleum biomarkers to be successful indicators of their depositional environments.

Geologists and geochemists use biomarker traces found in crude oils and their related source rock to unravel the stratigraphic origin and migration patterns of presently existing petroleum deposits. The dispersion of biomarker molecules is also quite distinctive for each type of oil and its source, hence, they display unique fingerprints. Another factor that makes petroleum biomarkers more preferable than their counterparts is because they have a high tolerance to environmental weathering and corrosion. Such biomarkers are very advantageous and often used in the detection of oil spillage in the major waterways. The same biomarkers can also be used to identify contamination in lubricant oils. However, biomarker analysis of untreated rock cuttings can be expected to produce misleading results. This is due to potential hydrocarbon contamination and biodegradation in the rock samples.

References

Petroleum geology